Radicondoli is a comune (municipality) in the Province of Siena in the Italian region Tuscany, located about  southwest of Florence and about  southwest of Siena.

Main sights
Churches in Radicondoli include the Collegiata dei Santi Simone e Giuda, with works by Pietro di Domenico and Alessandro Casolani.

People
Luciano Berio, Italian composer who lived  in Radicondoli from 1972.

References

External links

 Official website

Cities and towns in Tuscany
Hilltowns in Tuscany